LLJ may refer to:

Transportation
 Challis Airport (FAA code), Idaho, United States
 Silampari Airport (IATA code), Lubuklinggau, South Sumatra, Indonesia
 Lalganj railway station (India Railways station code LLJ), a railway station in Uttar Pradesh, India
 Llandudno Junction railway station (National Rail station code), Wales, U.K.

Other uses
 Ledji-Ledji language, an Australian Aboriginal language
 Lithuanian Liberal Youth (Lietuvos Liberalus Jaunimas), a political youth organization
 Long Live Jahseh
 Low Level Jet, a subcomponent of the South American Monsoon System